The 15th Iowa Infantry Regiment was an infantry regiment that served in the Union Army during the American Civil War.

Service
The 15th Iowa Infantry was organized at Keokuk, Iowa, and mustered in for three years of Federal service on February 22, 1862.

The regiment was mustered out on July 24, 1865.

Iowa Brigade
After the Battle of Shiloh, the Thirteenth Iowa was assigned to the Third Brigade of the Sixth Division. The Brigade was composed of the Eleventh, Thirteenth, 15th Iowa Volunteer Infantry Regiment and Sixteenth regiments of Iowa Infantry, and was under command of Colonel Crocker. This organization remained intact until the close of the war. Except when upon detached duty, the operations of each of the regiments were identified very largely with those of the brigade, and, therefore, the history of each of these four Iowa regiments is almost inseparably interwoven with that of the brigade.

Total strength and casualties
The 15th Iowa mustered a total of 1,926 men over the span of its existence.
It suffered 8 officers and 118 enlisted men who were killed in action or who died of their wounds and 1 officer and 260 enlisted men who died of disease, for a total of 387 fatalities.

Commanders
Colonel Hugh T. Reid
Colonel William W. Belknap

See also
List of Iowa Civil War Units
Iowa in the American Civil War

Notes

References
The Civil War Archive
15th Iowa regimental history

External links
15th Iowa Infantry in the American Civil War
 

Units and formations of the Union Army from Iowa
1862 establishments in Iowa
Military units and formations established in 1862
Military units and formations disestablished in 1865